The M9 Armored Combat Earthmover (ACE) is a highly mobile armored tracked vehicle that provides combat engineer support to front-line forces. Fielded by the United States Army, its tasks include eliminating enemy obstacles, maintenance and repair of roads and supply routes, and construction of fighting positions.

History
The M9 grew out of the Universal Engineer Tractor- "UET", a follow-on to 1958's All-purpose Ballastable Crawler (tractor) or "ABC".  By making a small tractor/scraper, it was possible to create a lightweight vehicle that could use local material as ballast. The weight was kept low enough to allow transportation in smaller cargo aircraft, to be air-droppable, and to allow the vehicle to float and swim. Initial development was between the Engineer Laboratory at Fort Belvoir, with International Harvester and Caterpillar. Successful in testing, and exciting a good deal of interest for civilian spin-off, the concept languished after a demonstration, where key decision-makers saw the vehicle sink in front of them while demonstrating its swimming ability.

The UET was originally seen as a squad vehicle, with provision for troop seats in the bowl, and was tested as a cargo vehicle, and even as a mobile mortar carrier.

The M9 is a highly mobile, armored, amphibious tractor, dozer, and scraper. It was finally fielded in 1986, and is capable of supporting forces in both offensive and defensive operations. It performs critical combat engineer tasks such as digging hull defilade fighting positions for guns, tanks and other battlefield systems to increase their survivability. The ACE breaches berms, prepares anti-tank ditches, prepares combat roads, removes roadblocks and prepares access routes at water obstacles.

The engine, drive train and driver's compartment are biased toward the rear of the vehicle, while the front comprises an 8.7 cubic yard (6.7 m³) bowl, apron and dozer blade with a composite aluminum ejector which can unload ballast and or cargo quickly in combat or hostile conditions. Armor consists of welded aluminum with selected steel and aramid-laminated plates. An armored cupola containing eight vision blocks covers the driver's compartment. The vehicle hull is welded and bolted aluminum with a two speed winch capable of 25,000 pound (110 kN) line pull. Towing pintle and airbrake connections are provided. It is equipped with a suspension system which allows the front of the vehicle to be raised, lowered, or tilted to permit dozing, excavating, rough grading and ditching functions. The M9 is armored against small arms and artillery fragmentation, has smoke screening capability, and chemical-biological protection for the operator. It is transportable in C-130, C-141, and C-5 aircraft and can swim at  under ideal conditions. Since the removal of swim missions as a task for the M9, the swim-related components are not required to be maintained.

By raising the dozer blade and using its scraper blade, the ACE can fill itself with ballast to improve dozing efficiency, it can also be ejected quickly eliminating the need for a bucket loader and dump truck. Another key feature of the M9 is its hydropneumatic suspension system. The principal components are eight high-pressure hydraulic rotary actuators (four on each side) which connect to the roadwheel stations. During high-speed travel, this system assures a smooth ride through the use of shock-absorbing accumulators. In earthmoving operations, the operator rotates the actuators, thus lowering the apron and blade for digging.

A typical combat engineer battalion will contain 22 ACEs - seven per company plus an operational readiness float. The active Army has a total of 447 M9 ACEs.

Employment
The M9 performs mobility, countermobility, sustainability, and survivability tasks in combination with light or heavy combined arms forces. Tasks include the excavation and preparation/reduction of obstacles i.e.; tank ditches, berms, trees, other hasty obstacles, it can transport wire and other engineering equipment for obstacle emplacements and destruction of enemy counter mobility obstacles, in the ballast area of the bowl behind the movable apron, bridging operations, battle fortified survivability positions, for command posts, air defense, communications equipment and critical supply/logistical/waste management/and bunkers. Other major tasks include route clearance support, and maintaining defensive positions, and offensive breach capability to include transport of mine clearing line charges.

In Operation Desert Storm the ACE proved to be a successful combination of armored vehicle and combat earthmover that was capable of keeping pace with the maneuver units because the ability to fold the blade in half upwards allows for unloaded travel but decreased combat efficiency due to the manual locking pins, which were usually unnecessary unless traveling at high speeds especially with ripper teeth attached. This can sever the blade hinges when not carefully monitored. When traveling downhill at high speeds beware of the next uphill all while providing crew excellent survivability. While some operators are not as efficient as the D7 Dozer in earth moving, some can outpace heavy slow traditional dozers by scraping in clutch brake 2 or three which overcomes lack of cutting ability due to lack of mass with speed. This ability to move with maneuver forces over several hundred kilometers of desert allowed it to successfully perform a wide variety of missions such as construction of combat roads and trails, survivability positions and berms. It can, move as fast as an M1 or M2 over rough terrain, but on improved roads and hardball it is limited to a maximum of 35 mph at most with some governors limited to around 27 mph. The vehicle operator can adjust to prevent this.

But the training of ACE operators appeared in some units to be inadequate constrained by a lack of technical mechanical expertise and maintenance of hydraulic accumulators systems. Most operators were unfamiliar with the techniques associated with dozing, scraping, cut and fill ops, and grading. The ACE experienced some troubles in reducing the berms associated with Iraqi tank ditches (berm on enemy side). Due to the location of the driver in relation to the vehicle blade, the soldiers have difficulty seeing bottom of blade, while buttoned up through the periscope, but can determine when he is about to tip over with the assistance of the horizon and the top of the blade creating an intersecting angle or with a manual level indicating the degree of slopes that are within acceptable operational capabilities. The ACE operator can use front-mounted telescope or a side-mounted periscope or video monitors to overcome this deficiency, also as load is increased the sound frequency of the engine changes indicating load to the experienced night operators, without the use of electronic or manual gauges. The ACE led the way in breaching the border berm between Saudi Arabia and Iraq, and in reducing trench-lines during the assault breach. The ACE performed beyond its expected capability. Later studies would discover its grim success against the unequipped Iraqi forces, with ACE's of the First Infantry Division burying hundreds or thousands of Iraqi soldiers alive in their trenches.

Problems were encountered with the ACE's trainers and maintenance shortcomings. One commander referred to the ACE operator as "Alone, Unarmed, and Unafraid". This highlights the ACE's major shortcomings as a piece of mobility equipment used during direct fire engagements. ACE operators, usually 19-year-old PFC's, led the 7th Corps breach into hostile country. Fortunately, they met with very light resistance. Otherwise, mortality among ACE operators would have been very high. The ACE is a single operator vehicle, Which section cohesion is pertinent to brigade and above mission success, without the moral and physical advantages of a crew with an NCO in leaderships, maintenance becomes difficult and self discipline and general mechanical and general electrical knowledge is a must for any lower enlisted. This lack of supervision creates highly valued subject matter experts who must understand the commanders intent and geography along with topography during hastily planned operations in austere environments, without the advantage of a weapon for local suppression. Habitually, maneuver task forces provided two M2 along with 2 M1 in diamond formation around valuable operators perhaps more.Bradley Fighting Vehicles to protect the ACE during breaching ops. While this is a high price to pay for protection of one vehicle, commanders deemed it necessary for the success of their operations. Commanders felt that the ACE needed an additional crewman and a protective weapon such as a .50 caliber machine gun or the Mark 19 grenade launcher, in their absence heavy caliber small arms such as the M249 squad automatic weapon or M240 bravo are often used..

Basis of issue 
 6 per Engineer Company in a Heavy Division
 6 per Armored Cavalry Regiment
 6 per Engineer Company, Heavy Separate Brigade
 6 per Engineer Combat Company (Mech) Corps
 6 per HHC, Engineer Battalion, Light Infantry Division
 4 per Engineer Company, Separate Infantry Brigade (Ribbon)
 2 per Engineer Company (Assault Float Bridge)(Ribbon) at Corps
 1 per Engineer Company (Medium Girder Bridge)
 1 per Bridge Company (Ribbon)

Training/personnel 
TRADOC instructors and New Equipment Training Teams (NETT) will be trained by the contractor. Initial training will be by NETT for Combat Engineer organizations issued the M9. Institutional training at U.S. Army Engineer Center at Fort Leonard Wood will provide training for the operator (MOS 12F) and maintainer (MOS 91L). Operator proficiency will be maintained by Training Extension Course tapes and extension training materials.

References

External links 
 Armored Combat Earthmover M9
 M-9 Armored Combat Earthmover at CombatIndex
 M9 Armored Combat Earthmover (ACE) abstract at Jane's
 M9ACE Technical Manuals M9ACE Technical Library

Military engineering vehicles of the United States
United States Marine Corps equipment
Military vehicles introduced in the 1980s